Branny Schepanovich, Q.C. (August 2, 1941 – January 15, 2007) was an Alberta lawyer and former politician.

Born in Cadomin, Alberta, he received his elementary education in Mercoal, Alberta and his senior matriculation from Edson High School in Edson, Alberta. He attended Royal Roads Military College in Victoria, British Columbia in 1959. He then earned a Bachelor of Arts in Political Science and his LL. B. from the University of Alberta, Edmonton.

He was admitted to the Alberta Bar in 1968 and was a long-time partner in the Edmonton law firm of McCuaig Desrochers LLP. He practiced law for nearly four decades throughout Alberta at all court levels. He was appointed Queen's Counsel in 2002.

He was a director of Air Canada from 1982 to 1985. Prior to practicing law, he worked as a Reporter for the Edmonton Journal in the summer of 1960, and as a reporter, news editor, managing editor, and editor-in-chief for the University of Alberta's Gateway from 1960 to 1964. He also worked summers as a news editor and reporter for CBC Television and CBC Radio from 1962 to 1966. Branny was President of the University of Alberta Students' Union from 1966 to 1967. He was a member of the Senate at the University of Alberta from 1966 to 1967. He was a Member of the University of Alberta Liberal Club from 1960 to 1967.

Branny was active in the Liberal Party of Canada in national and Alberta campaigns, and ran unsuccessfully as the Liberal candidate for the Edmonton Centre federal riding in the elections of 1972 and 1974. Over the years he served in numerous other capacities for the Liberal Party of Canada.

Branny was fluent in Serbo-Croatian, providing considerable legal counsel and assistance to his community. He was an active member of the St. Sava Serbian Orthodox Church in Edmonton.

1941 births
2007 deaths
Lawyers in Alberta
University of Alberta alumni
People from Yellowhead County